The 1967 Tangerine Bowl was an NCAA College Division game following the 1967 season, between  and . The most valuable players were defensive end Gordon Lambert and quarterback Errol Hook, both of Tennessee–Martin.

Background
The game was one of four regional finals in the College Division, the predecessor of Division II; the other three postseason games were the Pecan Bowl (also played on December 16), along with the Grantland Rice and Camellia bowls (both played on December 9).

Notable participants
Tennessee–Martin's Lambert, and West Chester quarterback Jim Haynie, were selected in the 1968 NFL/AFL Draft. Tennessee–Martin defensive end Julian Nunamaker was selected in the 1969 NFL/AFL Draft. Multiple members of the Tennessee–Martin team – including Lambert, Hook, Nunamaker, quarterback Allan Cox, kicker Lee Mayo, left tackle Gary Doble, and head coach Bob Carroll – are inductees of the university's hall of fame. West Chester quarterback Jim Haynie, offensive end Don Wilkinson, running back Paul Dunkleberger, and head coach Bob Mitten are inductees of their university's hall of fame.

Scoring summary

Statistics

References

Tangerine Bowl
Citrus Bowl (game)
UT Martin Skyhawks football bowl games
West Chester Golden Rams football bowl games
Tangerine Bowl
Tangerine Bowl